A shadbelly (North American English) is a type of riding coat worn in certain equestrian situations by fox hunting members, dressage riders, eventers (in the dressage phase of the higher levels), and occasionally by other hunt seat riders. Shadbellies are also standard attire for the show hack classes at certain breed shows in the United States and Canada. 

This coat is considered an element of very formal riding attire, and its use is therefore reserved for the most formal forms of equestrianism. When used in the classic hunt, they should not be worn by young riders, despite any trend or availability.

Terminology
The shadbelly coat is part of a formal wear category known as the tailcoat. The male version of the shadbelly is sometimes called a "weaselbelly".

The compound word "shadbelly" was also once spelled "shad belly", and the coat is also sometimes referred to as a "swallowtail".  Essentially, the space between the original two-word spellings has been removed, but not their meanings.

Today, "swallowtail" and "shadbelly" are used interchangeably for fox hunting in the United States, but "shadbelly" is the primary term used in various horse show disciplines.

History

The design is historically linked to the United Kingdom, where the famous dandy and trendsetter Beau Brummel popularized the style for daywear during the Regency period. By the 1860s the formal tailcoat was used almost exclusively for formal evening wear. European royalty wore the coat for formal occasions and portraits as well as for riding horseback. The Amish and Quakers wore the shadbelly to church functions.

The earliest recorded use of a shadbelly-type coat is in early Christianity, when Chaldean Christian priests wore coats representing the body of a fish.

Description
A shadbelly is usually black in color, although navy is becoming popular, and deep green is also occasionally seen in some nations. It has tails, double buttons, and either is worn over a vest (British English: waistcoat) of canary yellow or, particularly when worn in hot weather, has false yellow points peeking out under the cut-away front, to simulate the look of a vest. Vests or vest points of colours other than canary yellow are becoming more popular. Generally a white shirt with a ratcatcher collar and tied stock tie (a type of simple cravat) is standard. 

Traditionally, a shadbelly is worn with a top hat, white breeches and black riding boots. In recent years, some governing organizations have required that riders wear approved safety helmets instead of traditional hats and caps. Ideally white gloves should also be worn for a fully correct turnout, although many riders will wear black gloves while showing to make undesirable hand posture less conspicuous.

In the hunter ring, shadbellies have shorter, unweighted tails, compared to the long-weighted dressage tails.

References

 

Dressage
Hunt seat
Rider apparel
Coats (clothing)